In physics, Berry connection and Berry curvature are related concepts which can be viewed, respectively, as a local gauge potential and gauge field associated with the Berry phase or geometric phase. The concept was first introduced by S. Pancharatnam as geometric phase and later elaborately explained and popularized by Michael Berry in a paper published in 1984 emphasizing how geometric phases provide a powerful unifying concept in several branches of classical and quantum physics.

Berry phase and cyclic adiabatic evolution

In quantum mechanics, the Berry phase arises in a cyclic adiabatic evolution. The quantum adiabatic theorem applies to a system whose Hamiltonian  depends on a (vector) parameter  that varies with time .  If the 'th eigenvalue  remains non-degenerate everywhere along the path and the variation with time t is sufficiently slow, then a system initially in the normalized eigenstate  will remain in an instantaneous eigenstate  of the Hamiltonian , up to a phase, throughout the process.  Regarding the phase, the state at time t can be written as

where the second exponential term is the "dynamic phase factor." The first exponential term is the geometric term, with  being the Berry phase. From the requirement that  satisfy the time-dependent Schrödinger equation, it can be shown that

indicating that the Berry phase only depends on the path in the parameter space, not on the rate at which the path is traversed.

In the case of a cyclic evolution around a closed path  such that , the closed-path Berry phase is

An example of physical system where an electron moves along a closed path is cyclotron motion (details are given in the page of Berry phase). Berry phase must be considered to obtain the correct quantization condition.

Gauge transformation

A gauge transformation can be performed

to a new set of states that differ from the original ones only by an -dependent phase factor.  This modifies the open-path Berry phase to be .  For a closed path, continuity requires that  ( an integer), and it follows that  is invariant, modulo , under an arbitrary gauge transformation.

Berry connection
The closed-path Berry phase defined above can be expressed as

where 

is a vector-valued function known as the Berry connection (or Berry potential).  The Berry connection is gauge-dependent, transforming as
. Hence the local Berry connection  can never be physically observable. Thus,  is absolutely gauge-invariant, and may be related to physical observables.

Berry curvature

The Berry curvature is an anti-symmetric second-rank tensor derived from the Berry connection via

In a three-dimensional parameter space the Berry curvature can be written in the pseudovector form

In contrast to the Berry connection, which is physical only after integrating around a closed path, the Berry curvature is a gauge-invariant local manifestation of the geometric properties of the wavefunctions in the parameter space, and has proven to be an essential physical ingredient for understanding a variety of electronic properties.

For a closed path  that forms the boundary of a surface , the closed-path Berry phase can be rewritten using Stokes' theorem as

This number is the so-called Chern number, and is essential for understanding various quantization effects.

Finally, note that the Berry curvature can also be written as a sum over all other eigenstates in the form

Example: Spinor in a magnetic field

The Hamiltonian of a spin-1/2 particle in a magnetic field can be written as

where  denote the Pauli matrices,  is the magnetic moment, and B is the magnetic field. In three dimensions, the eigenstates have energies  and their eigenvectors are

Now consider the  state.  Its Berry connection can be computed as

, and the Berry curvature is 
This is consistent with the conclusion that the Berry connection is gauge-dependent while the Berry curvature is not.

In this case, the Berry phase corresponding to any given path on the unit sphere  in magnetic-field space is just half the solid angle subtended by the path.
The integral of the Berry curvature over the whole sphere is therefore exactly , so that the Chern number is unity, consistent with the Chern theorem.

Applications in crystals

The Berry phase plays an important role in modern investigations of electronic properties in crystalline solids and in the theory of the quantum Hall effect.
The periodicity of the crystalline potential allows the application of the Bloch theorem, which states that the Hamiltonian eigenstates take the form

Then, letting  play the role of the parameter , one can define Berry phases, connections, and curvatures in the reciprocal space. For example, the Berry connection in reciprocal space is

Because the Bloch theorem also implies that the reciprocal space itself is closed, with the Brillouin zone having the topology of a 3-torus in three dimensions, the requirements of integrating over a closed loop or manifold can easily be satisfied. In this way, such properties as the electric polarization, orbital magnetization, anomalous Hall conductivity, and orbital magnetoelectric coupling can be expressed in terms of Berry phases, connections, and curvatures.

References

External links
 The quantum phase, five years after. by M. Berry.
 Berry Phases and Curvatures in Electronic Structure Theory  A talk by D. Vanderbilt.
 Berry-ology, Orbital Magnetolectric Effects, and Topological Insulators - A talk by D. Vanderbilt.

Classical mechanics
Quantum phases